Henry Cotton (5 April 1882 – 1921) was an English footballer who played in goal for Nantwich, Burslem Port Vale, Crewe Alexandra, Wigan Town and Stoke in the 1900s.

Career
Cotton played for Nantwich, before joining Burslem Port Vale in May 1901. Preferred to William Chadwick, he played 29 Second Division games in the 1901–02 season. He played 32 league games in the 1902–03 and 1903–04 campaigns, and fended off competition from new signing Arthur Box to play 31 league games in the 1904–05 season. At this point he left the Athletic Ground and moved on to Crewe Alexandra. Between the sticks for Nantwich during the 1906–07 season, he signed for Wigan Town in the summer of 1907. With Stoke missing a reliable custodian in the 1908–09 season, Cotton kept goal in two Birmingham & District League games, before being sacked from the Victoria Ground.

Career statistics
Source:

References

Sportspeople from Crewe
English footballers
Association football goalkeepers
Nantwich Town F.C. players
Port Vale F.C. players
Crewe Alexandra F.C. players
Wigan Town A.F.C. players
Stoke City F.C. players
English Football League players
1882 births
1921 deaths